Jamie Theriot (born January 30, 1979 in Arnaudville, Louisiana) is an American jockey. The son of Thoroughbred horse trainer Harold Theriot, he is a nephew of jockey Larry Melancon.

Jamie Theriot, who began riding on bush tracks in his native Louisiana, turned professional at age 16. He has competed primarily on the Louisiana-Arkansas-Kentucky racing circuit, where he won a riding title at Evangeline Downs in 2001 and the 2003 riding title at Oaklawn Park Race Track.

In 2007, Theriot won his first Grade 1 race, capturing the Shadwell Turf Mile Stakes aboard Purim at Keeneland Race Course. On May 17, 2008, Theriot rode in his first American Classic, taking sixth place aboard Kentucky Bear in the Preakness Stakes at Pimlico Race Course. On June 18, 2008, he became the seventh rider in Churchill Downs history to ride six winners in a single day. In 2009, he won two Grade II races aboard Blame.

Controversy
On May 23, 2009, Theriot was aboard Sky Mom in the Grade III Arlington Matron at Arlington Park when his horse angled to the outside and clipped Born To Be, ridden by René Douglas. Born To Be clipped the horse running in front of her, knocking her unconscious and throwing her jockey René Douglas head-first into the track. Douglas was left paralyzed from the waist down due to the accident and Theriot was suspended for 30 days.

Notes
 Jamie Theriot's biography at Keeneland
 June 19, 2008 NTRA article titled Theriot bags six winners at Churchill
 Churchill Downs story titled Sizzling Theriot Soars in Spring Jockey Standings

References

Year-end charts

1979 births
Living people
American jockeys
Cajun jockeys
People from Arnaudville, Louisiana